Liolaemus rosenmanni is a species of lizard in the family Iguanidae.  It is from Chile.

References

rosenmanni
Lizards of South America
Reptiles of Chile
Endemic fauna of Chile
Reptiles described in 1992